The Imperial Order of Saint Anna (also "Order of Saint Anne" or "Order of Saint Ann") was a Holstein ducal and then Russian imperial order of chivalry. It was established by Karl Friedrich, Duke of Holstein-Gottorp, on 14 February 1735, in honour of his wife Anna Petrovna, daughter of Peter the Great of Russia.

Originally, the Order of Saint Anna was a dynastic order of knighthood; but between 1797 and 1917 it had dual status as a dynastic order and as a state order. The Order of St. Anna continued to be awarded after the revolution by Grand Duke Kirill Vladimirovich, Grand Duke Vladimir Kirillovich, and Grand Duchess Maria Vladimirovna. Today, the Russian Imperial Order of St. Anna, awarded by Grand Duchess Maria Vladimirovna is recognized as an order of chivalry by the privately operated ICOC as a continuation of the pre-Revolutionary order, and has been approved for wear with military uniform by the Russian Federation, but not by some members of the Romanov Family Association.

Membership of the Order was awarded for a distinguished career in civil service or for valour and distinguished service in the military. The Order of Saint Anna entitled recipients of the first class to hereditary nobility, and recipients of lower classes to personal nobility. For military recipients, it was awarded with swords. It is now usually awarded for meritorious service to the Imperial House of Russia.

Recipients of the Order of St. Andrew (K.A.) (including grand dukes, who received the order at baptism, and princes of the Imperial blood, who received it at their majority) simultaneously received the first class of the Order of Saint Anna.  The Emperor himself was the hereditary grand master of the Order.

The motto of the Order is "Amantibus Justitiam, Pietatem, Fidem" ("To those who love justice, piety, and fidelity").  Its festival day is 3 February (New Style, 16 February). The Head of the Imperial House of Russia always is Master of the imperial Order of Saint Anna.

History
At first, the Order had but one class and was named the "Order of Anna".  The statutes of the Order promulgated in 1735 established as the principal insignia a red-enameled gold cross, with an image of Saint Anne imposed upon the centre of the cross; the reverse bore the initials "A.I.P.F." (for "Anna Imperatoris Petri Filia":  "Anna, Emperor Peter's daughter" in Latin). The same letters also abbreviate the Latin motto (as the letter "J" did not exist in Latin, "Iustitiam" was the original spelling of the word now rendered "Justitiam").

In 1742, Karl Peter Ulrich, Duke Karl Friedrich's son, was declared the Russian heir apparent.  After arriving in Russia, he presented the Order to several courtiers. On 15 April 1797, his own son, Emperor Paul I of Russia, established the Order as part of the Imperial Russian system of honours and divided it into three classes, renaming it the "Order of Saint Anna".  Emperor Alexander I added a fourth class in 1815.

Recipients of the Order of St. Andrew (including grand dukes, who received the order at baptism, and princes of the Imperial blood, who received it at their majority) simultaneously received the first class of the Order of Saint Anna.  The Emperor himself was the hereditary chief of the Order.

The title of Chekhov's well-known story Anna on the Neck refers both to the Order and to the heroine.

In Chapter IV of Crime and Punishment Raskolnikov guesses that Luzhin must have, "...the Anna in his buttonhole and that he puts it on when he goes to dine with contractors or merchants."

Insignia

Methods of wear

 1st class: Cross worn at the bow of a broad ribbon (ten centimeters wide, worn over the left shoulder), on the right hip; star of the Order (about 95 millimeters in diameter) worn on the right breast
 2nd class: Cross worn on a neck ribbon, 45 millimeters wide
 3rd class: Cross worn on the left ribbon, suspended from a ribbon 28 millimeters wide
 4th class: Cross borne on the pommel of an edged weapon, together with a silver-tasselled sword-knot of the ribbon of the Order

The medal ribbon was red with narrow yellow edging.

A recipient of higher classes of the Order would not wear the insignia of lower classes, unless he had also been awarded the fourth class (the insignia of which was borne on the hilt of a sword or other edged weapon).

Bibliography
Alan W. Hazelton, The Russian Imperial Orders; New York:  The American Numismatic Society, 1932 (Numismatic Notes and Monograms, No. 51).

Guy Stair Sainty (Ed.) “World Orders of Knighthood and Merit” London: Burke's Peerage, 2006.

Notable recipients 

1st Class
Alexander Abaza
Frederick Adam
Adolphus Frederick V, Grand Duke of Mecklenburg-Strelitz
Adrian Nepenin
Hasan bey Agalarov
Ahmad Shah Qajar
Albert I of Belgium
Prince Albert of Prussia (1809–1872)
Archduke Albrecht, Duke of Teschen
Albert, Prince Consort
Mikhail Alekseyev
Ilya I. Alekseyev
Yevgeni Ivanovich Alekseyev
Alexander I of Russia
Alexander I of Yugoslavia
Alexander II of Russia
Alexander III of Russia
Alexander Nikolaevich Golitsyn
Alexander of Battenberg
Prince Alexander of Hesse and by Rhine
Duke Alexander of Oldenburg
Duke Alexander of Württemberg (1771–1833)
Alexei Arbuzov (general)
Alexei Nikolaevich, Tsarevich of Russia
Gyula Andrássy
Teodor Andrault de Langeron
Stepan Andreyevskiy
Alexander Cambridge, 1st Earl of Athlone
Prince August, Duke of Dalarna
Prince August of Württemberg
Prince Augustus of Prussia
Theodor Avellan
Karl Gustav von Baggovut
Alexander Bagration of Mukhrani
Pyotr Bagration
Aleksei Baiov
Mikhail Bakhirev
Jafargulu Bakikhanov
Pyotr Baluyev
Alexander Barclay de Tolly-Weymarn
Michael Andreas Barclay de Tolly
Nikolai Bardovsky
Edward Barnes (British Army officer)
Pavel Bashutsky
Mikhail Batyanov
Vasili Bebutov
Alexander von Benckendorff (diplomat)
Konstantin von Benckendorff
Ilya Berezin
Pyotr Bezobrazov
Aleksandr Aleksandrovich Bibikov
Alexander Alexandrovich von Bilderling
Aleksei Birilev
Otto von Bismarck
Gebhard Leberecht von Blücher
Georgy Bobrikov
Nikolai Bobyr
Woldemar von Boeckmann
Alexander Bozheryanov
Władysław Grzegorz Branicki
Walther Bronsart von Schellendorff
Aleksei Brusilov
Pavel Bulgakov
Prince Carl, Duke of Västergötland
Carlos I of Portugal
Charles XV
Alexander Chavchavadze
Grigori Chernozubov
Alexander Chernyshyov
Seraphim Chichagov
Grigory Choglokov
Christian IX of Denmark
Grigoriy Pavlovich Chukhnin
Andrzej Ciechanowiecki
Prince Constantine of Imereti (1789–1844)
Didi-Niko Dadiani
Mikhail Pavlovich Danilov
Dmitry Dashkov
Henri Roussel de Courcy
Dmitry Petrovich Dokhturov
Leopold Wilhelm von Dobschütz
Józef Dowbor-Muśnicki
Alexander Drenteln
Mikhail Drozdovsky
Pavel Grigorievich Dukmasov
Alexander Alexandrovich Dushkevich
Andrei Eberhardt
Edward VII
Carl August Ehrensvärd (1858–1944)
Johann Martin von Elmpt
Grigori Engelhardt
Nikolai Epanchin
Ernest I, Duke of Saxe-Coburg and Gotha
Ernest Louis, Grand Duke of Hesse
Gaston Errembault de Dudzeele (died 1888)
Gaston Errembault de Dudzeele (died 1929)
Archduke Eugen of Austria
Aleksei Evert
Ferdinand I of Bulgaria
Ferdinand II of Portugal
Archduke Ferdinand Karl Joseph of Austria-Este
Hans William von Fersen
Nikolai Filatov
Vladimir Nikolayevich Filipov
Vasily Flug
Dmitry Gustavovich von Fölkersahm
Francis IV, Duke of Modena
Franz Joseph I of Austria
Archduke Franz Karl of Austria
Frederick VIII of Denmark
Frederick Francis III, Grand Duke of Mecklenburg-Schwerin
Frederick I, Grand Duke of Baden
Archduke Friedrich, Duke of Teschen
Friedrich, Duke of Schleswig-Holstein-Sonderburg-Glücksburg
Ivan Fullon
Vasily Gabashvili
Apollon Galafeyev
Yermolay Gamper
Ivan Ganetsky
Ivan Gannibal
Charles Gascoigne
Gavriil Gagarin
George V
Aleksandr Gerngross
Alexander Gertsyk
Alexander von Güldenstubbe
August Neidhardt von Gneisenau
Vasily Golovnin
Vladimir Gorbatovsky
Eugène Goüin
Ivan Grigorovich
Oskar Gripenberg
Gustaf V
Gustaf VI Adolf
Gustav, Prince of Vasa
Haakon VII of Norway
Sir Robert Hart, 1st Baronet
Lodewijk van Heiden
Prince Heinrich of Hesse and by Rhine
Herbert Holman
Dmitry Horvat
Alexander Ievreinov
Gavriil Ignatyev
Illarion Vasilchikov
Alexander Imeretinsky
Yevgeni Iskritsky
Nikola Ivanov
Grigory Ivanovich Villamov
Archduke John of Austria
Prince Johann of Schleswig-Holstein-Sonderburg-Glücksburg
John VI of Portugal
Joseph, Duke of Saxe-Altenburg
Georg von Kameke
Kyprian Kandratovich
Nikolay Karamzin
Karl Anton, Prince of Hohenzollern
Karl, Duke of Schleswig-Holstein-Sonderburg-Glücksburg
Prince Karl Theodor of Bavaria
Nikolai Kashtalinsky
Alexander von Kaulbars
Paisi Kaysarov
Gustav von Kessel
Terence Keyes
Pyotr Kikin
Jan Hendrik van Kinsbergen
Vladimir Kislitsin
Hans von Koester
Alexander Kolchak
Grand Duke Konstantin Konstantinovich of Russia
Grand Duke Konstantin Nikolayevich of Russia
Grand Duke Konstantin Pavlovich of Russia
Konstantin Poltoratsky
Konstantin of Hohenlohe-Schillingsfürst
Apostol Kostanda
Wincenty Krasiński
Vasily Kravkov
Gerhard Christoph von Krogh
Aleksey Kuropatkin
Aglay Dmitriyevich Kuzmin-Korovaev
Kyrill (Dmitrieff)
Sergey Stepanovich Lanskoy
Pavel Pavlovich Lebedev
Leonid Lesh
Leopold I of Belgium
Leopold II of Belgium
Leopold IV, Duke of Anhalt
Alexander Mikhailovich Lermontov
George Maximilianovich, 6th Duke of Leuchtenberg
Sergei Georgievich, 8th Duke of Leuchtenberg
Kazimir Vasilevich Levitsky
Émile Loubet
Louis IV, Grand Duke of Hesse
Prince Louis of Battenberg
Friedrich von Löwis of Menar
Archduke Ludwig Viktor of Austria
Luís I of Portugal
August von Mackensen
Sir Charles Madden, 1st Baronet
Safarbek Malsagov
Mamia V Gurieli
 Manuel II of Portugal
Grigorios Maraslis
Grand Duchess Maria Vladimirovna of Russia
Maximilian I of Mexico
Leonid Maykov
Duke William of Mecklenburg-Schwerin
Duke Charles of Mecklenburg
Feofil Egorovich Meyendorf
Grand Duke Michael Nikolaevich of Russia
Grand Duke Michael Alexandrovich of Russia
Miguel I of Portugal
Konstantin Mikhaylovsky
Prince Mikheil of Georgia
Milan I of Serbia
Mikhail Miloradovich
Prince Mirian of Georgia
Mikhail Mirkovich
Pavel Mishchenko
Miura Gorō
Sayyid Mir Muhammad Alim Khan
Alexander von Moller
Helmuth von Moltke the Elder
Helmuth von Moltke the Younger
Rudolf Montecuccoli
Nikolay Mordvinov (admiral)
Hendrik Pieter Nicolaas Muller
Mikhail Nikitich Muravyov
James Wolfe Murray
Valentin Musin-Pushkin
Ivan Nabokov
Dmitry Nadyozhny
Pavel Nakhimov
Napoleon III
Tovmas Nazarbekian
Dmitry Neverovsky
Vasily Nezabitovsky
Nicholas II of Russia
Nicholas Alexandrovich, Tsesarevich of Russia
Grand Duke Nicholas Nikolaevich of Russia (1831–1891)
Arkady Nikanorovich Nishenkov
Vladimir Nikolayevich Nikitin
Alexander Nikolaevich Volzhin
Nikolai Stogov
August Ludwig von Nostitz
Nikolai Obolensky
Peter Obolyaninov
Georgy Orbeliani
Alexey Fyodorovich Orlov
David Ivanovich Orlov
Oscar II
Fabian Gottlieb von der Osten-Sacken
Archduke Otto of Austria (1865–1906)
Otto of Bavaria
José Paranhos, Viscount of Rio Branco
Viktor Pashutin
Duke Paul Frederick of Mecklenburg
Pedro V of Portugal
Maurice Pellé
Duke Peter of Oldenburg
Racho Petrov
Prince Philippe, Count of Flanders
Dmitry Pikhno
Georg Dubislav Ludwig von Pirch
Mikhail Mikhailovich Pleshkov
Carlo Andrea Pozzo di Borgo
Mohammad Shah Qajar
Mozaffar ad-Din Shah Qajar
Naser al-Din Shah Qajar
Fyodor Radetsky
Evgeny Aleksandrovich Radkevich
Nikolai Pavlovich Raev
Kirill Razumovski
Nikolai Reitsenshtein
George Mikhailovich Romanov
Christopher Roop
Fyodor Rostopchin
Nikolay Rtishchev
Prince Rudolf of Liechtenstein
Rudolf, Crown Prince of Austria
Adam Rzhevusky
Guillaume Emmanuel Guignard, vicomte de Saint-Priest
Vladimir Viktorovich Sakharov
Anton Yegorovich von Saltza
Alexander Samsonov
Pavel Savvich
Johan Eberhard von Schantz
Sergei Sheydeman
Eduard Schensnovich
Yakov Schkinsky
Grand Duke Sergei Alexandrovich of Russia
Ivan Ivanovich Shamshev
Dmitry Shcherbachev
Ivan Shestakov
Aliagha Shikhlinski
Dmitry Shuvayev
Mikhail Skobelev
Arkady Skugarevsky
Vladimir Vasilyevich Smirnov
Mikhail Sokovin
Georg von Stackelberg
Archduke Stephen of Austria (Palatine of Hungary)
Hermann von Strantz
Dejan Subotić
Vladimir Sukhomlinov
Felix Sumarokov-Elston
Sylvester Stankievich
Ludwig Freiherr von und zu der Tann-Rathsamhausen
Alexander von Taube
Arshak Ter-Gukasov
Nikolai Tretyakov
Johann Nepomuk von Triva
Dmitry Troshchinsky
Erast Tsytovich
Georgy Tumanov
Fyodor Tyutchev
Paul Simon Unterberger
Prince Valdemar of Denmark
Sergei Vasilchikov
Georgy Vasmund
Nikolai Velyaminov
Anthony Veselovsky
Robert Viren
Grand Duke Vladimir Alexandrovich of Russia
Grand Duke Vladimir Kirillovich of Russia
Nikita Volkonsky
Illarion Vorontsov-Dashkov
Nikolay Vuich
Alfred von Waldersee
Arthur Wellesley, 1st Duke of Wellington
Wilhelm II, German Emperor
William I, German Emperor
William II of Württemberg
Sergei Witte
Ludwig von Wolzogen
Duke Eugen of Württemberg (1788–1857)
Sir James Wylie, 1st Baronet
Nikolai Yanushkevich
Aleksey Petrovich Yermolov
Nikolai Yudenich
Pavel Zelenoy
Ferdinand von Zeppelin
Arthur Zimmermann
August zu Eulenburg
Dmitry Zuyev
2nd Class
Alois Lexa von Aehrenthal
Ilyas bey Aghalarov
Akiyama Yoshifuru
Harold Alexander, 1st Earl Alexander of Tunis
Alexei Arbuzov (general)
Alfred, 2nd Prince of Montenuovo
Władysław Anders
Nikolai Anderson
Ivane Andronikashvili
Dmitry Anuchin
Christophor Araratov
Pavel Argeyev
Arsen of Tbilisi
Pyotr Romanovich Bagration
Jaques Bagratuni
Nikolai Baratov
Vasily Baumgarten
John Charles Beckwith (British Army officer)
Daniel Bek-Pirumian
Sergey Vasilyevich Belyaev
Mikhail Berens
Vasily Berkov
Albrecht Besserer von Thalfingen
Vasily Biskupsky
Herbert von Bismarck
Wilhelm von Bismarck
Georgy Bobrikov
Nikolai Bobyr
Woldemar von Boeckmann
Petro Bolbochan
Vasily Boldyrev
Julius von Bose
Eugene Botkin
Frīdrihs Briedis
Nikolai Ilyich Bulatov
Constantin Cantacuzino (died 1877)
Leo von Caprivi
Mateiu Caragiale
Alexandru Cernat
Alexander Chechenskiy
Grigori Chernozubov
Seraphim Chichagov
Grigory Choglokov
Sophus Christensen
Peter Christophersen
Nicolae Ciupercă
Arthur Clifton
Norman Coates
Duke Constantine Petrovich of Oldenburg
Francis Cromie
Nikolai Dimitrievich Dabić
Alexander Lvovich Davydov
Evgraf Davydov
Anton Denikin
Mikhail Diterikhs
Dmitry Petrovich Dokhturov
Vasily Andreyevich Dolgorukov
Ivan Alekseevich Dwigubski
Alfred Mordaunt Egerton
William George Keith Elphinstone
Ivan Fyodorovich Emme
Oskar Enqvist
Nikolai Epanchin
Ludwig von Falkenhausen
Alexey Favorsky
Thomas Fellowes (Royal Navy officer, born 1778)
Frederick Field (Royal Navy officer)
Vladimir Nikolayevich Filipov
Carl Andreas Fougstad
Ivan Fullon
Ivan Ganetsky
Robert Gardiner (British Army officer)
Vasily Gavrilov
Alexander Gertsyk
Webb Gillman
Vladimir Gittis
Andrey Glebov
Fyodor Gogel
William Maynard Gomm
Vladimir Gorbatovsky
Mikhail Dmitrievich Gorchakov
Pyotr Gorlov
James Grierson
Erich von Gündell
Vasily Gurko
Hovhannes Hakhverdyan
Karl Eberhard Herwarth von Bittenfeld
Max Horton
Dmitry Horvat
Reginald Hoskins
John Hobart Caradoc, 2nd Baron Howden
Dietrich von Hülsen-Haeseler
Alexander Ievreinov
Nikolay Ilminsky
Karl Jessen
Alexander Kazakov
Mikhail Khilkov
Boris Khreschatitsky
Alexander Khristiani
Friedrich von Kielmansegg
Hugo W. Koehler
Roman Kondratenko
August Kork
Lavr Kornilov
Apostol Kostanda
Stiliyan Kovachev
Sergey Kravkov (agronomist)
Vasily Kravkov
Alexander J. Kravtsov
Petr G. Kravtsov
Aleksandr Krymov
Julius Kuperjanov
Aglay Dmitriyevich Kuzmin-Korovaev
Vladimir Kuzmin-Karavayev
Johan Laidoner
Sergey Stepanovich Lanskoy
Hans Leesment
Alexander Mikhailovich Lermontov
Alexander Karl Nikolai von Lieven
Antoni Listowski
Walter von Loë
George Bingham, 3rd Earl of Lucan
Fedir Lyzohub
Pavel Maksutov
Safarbek Malsagov
Carl Gustaf Emil Mannerheim
Vladimir May-Mayevsky
Leonid Maykov
Karim bey Mehmandarov
Emmanuel von Mensdorff-Pouilly
Mikhail Mirkovich
Ernst von Mohl
Stefan Mokrzecki
Theodor Molien
Dmitry Nadyozhny
Tovmas Nazarbekian
Vasily Nezabitovsky
Alexander Nikolaevich Volzhin
Amos Norcott
Vasily Fedorovich Novitsky
Nikolai Obolensky
Ilia Odishelidze
David Ivanovich Orlov
Ivan Ozerov
Dmitri Parsky
Anatoly Pepelyayev
Pavel Pereleshin
Vasily Perfilyev
Adolph Pfingsten
Dmitry Pikhno
Karl von Plettenberg
Alexander Stepanovich Popov
Kazimierz Porębski
Ignacy Prądzyński
Mikhail Promtov
Amanullah Mirza Qajar
Fyodor Radetsky
Evgeny Aleksandrovich Radkevich
Antoni Wilhelm Radziwiłł
Wilhelm von Ramming
Kirill Razumovski
Aleksandr Vladimirovich Razvozov
Paul von Rennenkampf
Pyotr Ivanovich Ricord
Christopher Roop
Hew Dalrymple Ross
Carlo Rossi (architect)
Zinovy Rozhestvensky
Friedrich von Rüdiger
Adam Rzhevusky
Vladimir Saitov
Vladimir Viktorovich Sakharov
Pavel Savvich
Pavel Schilling
Yakov Schkinsky
Ioan Axente Sever
Boris Shaposhnikov
Aliagha Shikhlinski
Sergey I. Shivtzov
Fyodor Shubin
Volodymyr Sikevych
Alexander Sirotkin
Boris Skibine
Pavlo Skoropadskyi
Jan Zygmunt Skrzynecki
Vladimir Vasilyevich Smirnov
Mikhail Sokovin
Christian von Steven
Sylvester Stankievich
Pavel Sytin
Pyotr Telezhnikov
Robert Richard Torrens
Robert Torrens (British Army officer)
Richard M. Trevethan
Charles Lawrence, 2nd Baron Trevethin
Ivan Trutnev
Erast Tsytovich
Mikhail Tukhachevsky
Georgy Tumanov
Eustachy Tyszkiewicz
Konstantin Vakulovsky
Sergei Vasilchikov
Georgy Vasmund
Julius von Verdy du Vernois
Vladimir Vernadsky
Grigory Verzhbitsky
Anthony Veselovsky
Wilgelm Vitgeft
Vladimir Vitkovsky
John Waters (British Army officer, born 1774)
Stanley Price Weir
Alfred Welby
Constantin Westchiloff
Sergei Wojciechowski
Lucjan Żeligowski
Silvestras Žukauskas
3rd Class
Adrian Nepenin
Alexander Afanasyev
Ilyas bey Aghalarov
Prince Albert of Saxe-Altenburg
Nikolai Anderson
Vladimir Arsenyev
Jaques Bagratuni
Aleksei Baiov
Andrei Bakich
Edward Bamford
Alexander Barclay de Tolly-Weymarn
Vasily Baumgarten
Daniel Bek-Pirumian
Vasily Biskupsky
Georgy Bobrikov
Woldemar von Boeckmann
Petro Bolbochan
Vasily Boldyrev
Fyodor Bronnikov
Jonas Budrys
Nikolai Ilyich Bulatov
Grigori Chernozubov
Seraphim Chichagov
Grigory Choglokov
Christopher Courtney
Nikolai Dimitrievich Dabić
Hubert Edward Dannreuther
Alexander Alexandrovich Dushkevich
Harold Edward Elliott
Nikolai Epanchin
Gunther von Etzel
Sergei Fyodorov (surgeon)
Nikolai Filatov
Vladimir Nikolayevich Filipov
Vasily Flug
Lev Galler
Ivan Ganetsky
Hamilton Gault
Alexander Gertsyk
Vladimir Gorbatovsky
Hovhannes Hakhverdyan
John Hearson
Dmitry Horvat
Oleksander Hrekov
Karol Hutten-Czapski
Alexander Ievreinov
Nikolai Ignatev
Arnolds Indriksons
Platon Ioseliani
Anton Irv
Ismayil bek Kutkashensky
Leonard Jaczewski
Alan Jerrard
Jonas Juška
Alexey Kaledin
Kyprian Kandratovich
Vladimir Kappel
Dmitry Karbyshev
Boris Khreschatitsky
Alexander Khristiani
Konstantinas Kleščinskis
Nikolai Kolomeitsev
August Kork
Nikolai Kravkov
Vasily Kravkov
Alexander J. Kravtsov
Petr G. Kravtsov
Julius Kuperjanov
Ants Kurvits
Aglay Dmitriyevich Kuzmin-Korovaev
Vladimir Kuzmin-Karavayev
Hans Leesment
Leonid Lesh
Alexander Mikhailovich Lermontov
Nikolai Linevich
Antoni Listowski
Ivan Loiko
Einar Lundborg
Donat Makijonek
Safarbek Malsagov
Karim bey Mehmandarov
Feofil Egorovich Meyendorf
Sergei Mezheninov
Ivan Vladimirovich Michurin
Mikhail Mirkovich
Syla Mishchenko
Stefan Mokrzecki
Dmitry Nadyozhny
Jan Nagórski
Jafargulu Khan Nakhchivanski
Jamshid Nakhchivanski
Tovmas Nazarbekian
Danail Nikolaev
Vasily Fedorovich Novitsky
Nikolai Obolensky
Vladimir Olderogge
Alexey Fyodorovich Orlov
David Ivanovich Orlov
Vasily Perfilyev
Mikhail Mikhailovich Pleshkov
Georgy Polkovnikov
Peter Polovtsov
Alexander Stepanovich Popov
Mikhail Promtov
Feyzullah Mirza Qajar
Fyodor Radetsky
Evgeny Aleksandrovich Radkevich
Alexander Ragoza
Yuri Rall
Kirill Razumovski
Alexander Rodzyanko
Friedrich von Rüdiger
Carl Rustad
Adam Rzhevusky
Vladimir Saitov
Vladimir Viktorovich Sakharov
Victor Zaharevich Savelyev
Pavel Savvich
Sergei Sheydeman
Yakov Schkinsky
Shafi Khan Qajar
Rodion Shchedrin
Dmitry Shcherbinovsky
Pyotr Shchetinkin
Aliagha Shikhlinski
Javad khan Shirvanski
Volodymyr Sikevych
Alexander Sirotkin
Boris Skibine
Arkady Skugarevsky
Ivan Smirnov (aviator)
Vladimir Vasilyevich Smirnov
Mikhail Sokovin
Viktor Spiridonov
Georgy Stepanov
Mykola Stsiborskyi
Sylvester Stankievich
Pavel Sytin
Marceli Tarczewski
Alexander von Taube
Vasily Tchernetzov
Pyotr Telezhnikov
Valentin Ternavtsev
Vyacheslav Tkachov
Fyodor Tolbukhin
John Tovey, 1st Baron Tovey
Hugh Trenchard, 1st Viscount Trenchard
Vyacheslav Troyanov
Ivan Trutnev
Konstantin Tsiolkovsky
Georgy Tumanov
Leonid Ustrugov
Konstantin Vakulovsky
Sergei Vasilchikov
Georgy Vasmund
Vladimir Vitkovsky
Tom Webb-Bowen
Pyotr Wrangel
Ivan Iosifovich Yakubovsky
Alexander Zelenoy
Mikhail Zoshchenko
Silvestras Žukauskas
4th Class
Mikhail Alafuso
Alexei Arbuzov (general)
Tarlan Aliyarbayov
Vladimir Arsenyev
Jaques Bagratuni
Alexander Barclay de Tolly-Weymarn
Mikhail Batorsky
Daniel Bek-Pirumian
Vasily Biskupsky
Petro Bolbochan
Seraphim Chichagov
Nikolai Epanchin
Ivan Fullon
Yury Gilsher
Hovhannes Hakhverdyan
Arnolds Indriksons
Ismayil bek Kutkashensky
Aleksander Jaakson
Mykola Kapustiansky
Valentin Kataev
Boris Khreschatitsky
Konstantinas Kleščinskis
Nikolay Kokorin
Konstantin Poltoratsky
August Kork
Sergey Kravkov (explorer)
Alexander J. Kravtsov
Yevgraf Kruten
Julius Kuperjanov
Ants Kurvits
Johan Laidoner
Ernst Leman
Ivan Loiko
Donat Makijonek
Safarbek Malsagov
Evgeny Messner
Sergei Mezheninov
Aleksandr Mirkovich
Syla Mishchenko
Sava Mutkurov
Jan Nagórski
Jamshid Nakhchivanski
Vladimir Nikolayevich Nikitin
Garegin Nzhdeh
David Ivanovich Orlov
Ivan Orlov (aviator)
Aleksandr Pishvanov
Georgy Polkovnikov
Feyzullah Mirza Qajar
Alexander Ragoza
Yuri Rall
Kirill Razumovski
Aleksandr Vladimirovich Razvozov
Alfred Saalwächter
Mikhail Safonov (pilot)
Pavel Savvich
Sergei Sheydeman
Yakov Schkinsky
Alexander Sedyakin
Aliagha Shikhlinski
Fyodor Shubin
Volodymyr Sikevych
Alexander Sirotkin
Georgy Stepanov
Vladimir Strzhizhevsky
Mykola Stsiborskyi
Jan Syrový
Pavel Sytin
Vasily Tchernetzov
Leo Tolstoy
Vyacheslav Troyanov
Konstantin Vakulovsky
Johannes Vares
Vladimir Vitkovsky
Vasili Yanchenko
Mikhail Zoshchenko
Silvestras Žukauskas
Dmitry Zuyev
Franciszek Żwirko
Other or Unknown Classes
James Hamilton, 2nd Duke of Abercorn
Prince Adarnase of Kartli
Duke Adolf Friedrich of Mecklenburg
David Murray Anderson
John Asser
Sir John Baddeley, 1st Baronet
Poghos Bek-Pirumyan
Francis Walter Belt
Jacques Bergeret
Pavel Bermondt-Avalov
Andrew Bertie
Peter von Bilderling
Friedrich Wilhelm von Bismarck
Afrikan P. Bogaewsky
Adolf von Bonin
Leimistin Broussan
Alexander Romanovich Bruce
Ernesto Burzagli
Hayk Bzhishkyan
Nicolae Condeescu
Adam Kazimierz Czartoryski
Xawery Czernicki
Jan Henryk Dąbrowski
Nicolae Dăscălescu
Guy Dawnay (British Army officer)
Léon de Witte de Haelen
Radko Dimitriev
Alexander Ivanovich Dmitriev-Mamonov
Dmitry Bagration-Imeretinsky
Franciszek Ksawery Drucki-Lubecki
Henri du Couëdic de Kerérant
John Lambton, 1st Earl of Durham
Johann Dzierzon
Harold Edwards (RCAF officer)
Felix Funke
Alexander V. Golubintzev
Ernest Goüin
Władysław Gurowski
Thomas Noel Harris
Helen Scott Hay
Philip, Landgrave of Hesse-Homburg
Carl von Hoffman
David Edward Hughes
Edgar Erskine Hume
Prince Levan of Georgia
John Paul Jones
Karađorđe
Nikolai Kashirin
Aleksey Khovansky (publisher)
Aleksey Korin
Vladimir Kossogovsky
Jan Kozietulski
Alexey V. Kravtsov
Mikhail Krechetnikov
Alexey Kurakin
Jacques-Joachim Trotti, marquis de La Chétardie
Lev Lagorio
Maksud Alikhanov
Guglielmo Marconi
Lucy Minnigerode
Hugh Henry Mitchell
Vincent Barkly Molteno
Auguste de Montferrand
Joachim Joseph André Murat
Ludwik Narbutt
Joseph Cornelius O'Rourke
Mārtiņš Peniķis
Constantin Poenaru
Sir John Pollock, 4th Baronet
Dighton Probyn
Mohammad Taqi Mirza Rokn ed-Dowleh
Eric Gascoigne Robinson
Roman Vorontsov
Alexey Schastny
Fyodor Schechtel
Alexei Senyavin
Andrei Shkuro
Boris Shteifon
Josip Šokčević
Constantin Stamati
Curt von Stedingk
Dmitry Strukov
Jerzy Świrski
Stanisław Tatar
Samuel Hoare, 1st Viscount Templewood
Constantin von Tischendorf
Tomkyns Hilgrove Turner
Haim Aharon Valero
Albert Vizentini
Ivan Illarionovich Vorontsov
Baldwin Wake Walker
Eric Sherbrooke Walker
Nikolay Yung
Nikanor Zakhvatayev
Mikhail Zasulich
Yakov Zhilinsky
Theodoor Johan Arnold van Zijll de Jong
Asad-bey Talyshkhanov

References

External links

  Order of St. Anna
  History of the order of St. Anna

1735 establishments in the Holy Roman Empire
18th-century awards

Orders of chivalry of Russia
Saint Anna, Order of
Saint Anna, Order of
Saint Anne